Alexander Lekov (born 29 June 1968 in Vladikavkaz) is a Russian Paralympic footballer who won a silver medal at the 2008 Summer Paralympics in China.

References

External links
 
 

1968 births
Living people
Paralympic 7-a-side football players of Russia
Paralympic silver medalists for Russia
Paralympic medalists in football 7-a-side
7-a-side footballers at the 2008 Summer Paralympics
Medalists at the 2008 Summer Paralympics
Sportspeople from Vladikavkaz
21st-century Russian people